The Journal of Hand Surgery (European Volume) is a peer-reviewed medical journal that covers the fields of orthopedics and surgery as related to the human hand. The editor-in-chief is Wee Lam. It was established in 1969 and is published by SAGE Publications on behalf of the British Society for Surgery of the Hand.

Abstracting and indexing 
The journal is abstracted and indexed in Scopus and the Science Citation Index Expanded. According to the Journal Citation Reports, its 2017 impact factor is 2.648.

References

External links 
 
 British Society for Surgery of the Hand

SAGE Publishing academic journals
English-language journals
Surgery journals
Publications established in 1969
9 times per year journals